The , signed as Route 5, is one of the routes of the Hanshin Expressway system serving the Keihanshin area. It is an intercity route that travels in an east to west direction from Suminoe-ku, Osaka to Tarumi-ku, Kobe.

See also

References

External links

Roads in Hyōgo Prefecture
Roads in Osaka Prefecture
5
1991 establishments in Japan